Howard Pennett Cooper, CBE (born 17 April 1949) is an English former first-class cricketer, who played for Yorkshire from 1971 to 1980, and for Northern Transvaal in the 1973/4 season

Cooper was born in Great Horton, Bradford, Yorkshire.  He played club cricket for Bankfoot C.C.  He developed his talent for swing and seam at brisk pace through Bankfoot's junior teams, before helping them win the Bradford League championship in 1972.  Howard re-joined the club as captain in 1984, where they gained promotion and led the side and the bowling attack for a further two years in Division One.

Cooper was a right arm medium pace bowler, and tail end left-handed batsman.  In 101 first-class matches, he took 233 wickets, with a best of 8-62, at an average of 28.02.  He scored 1,191 runs, with a best score of 56, at an average of 14.34. He took 177 wickets at 23.63 in 142 one day games, with a career best of 6-14.

References

External links
Cricinfo Profile

1949 births
Living people
English cricketers
Northerns cricketers
Yorkshire cricketers
People from Great Horton
Minor Counties cricketers
Sportspeople from Yorkshire